The Vispa is a river in the canton of Valais, located in the Visp area. It is essentially composed of two large branches: the Matter Vispa and the Saaser Vispa, converging at Stalden, then forming the Vispa proper, flowing for less than  before converging with the Rhône at Visp. The Vispa is a left and major affluent of the Rhône, before it enters Lake Geneva.

The Vispa collects the waters from the Mattertal (formed by the Matter Vispa) and the Saastal (formed by the Saaser Vispa), the two highest valleys in Switzerland and the Pennine Alps. As a result, the river is characterized by a glacial regime, similarly to the Massa, another nearby affluent of the Rhône.

The Matter Vispa is the longest of the two branches. It comprehends small but numerous affluents, notably the Gornera, Zmuttbach, Triftbach and Findelbach, all around Zermatt, but also the Täschbach and Schalibach, near Täsch, and the Riedbach, near St. Niklaus. The Matter Vispa (and Vispa) is closely followed by the Matterhorn Gotthard Bahn, a railway connecting Zermatt to Visp.

The Saaser Vispa is second-longest affluent of the Vispa. It comprehends only a few short affluents, the largest being the Furggbach, converging near Saas-Almagell. The Saaser Vispa flows through the Mattmarksee, an artificial lake located near its source, and notably collect the waters from the Fee Glacier (through the Feeru Vispa), near Saas-Fee.

The Vispa proper, forming the Vispertal (German: Visp valley), constitutes the shortest section.

References
The Vispa on the National Map of Switzerland

External links

Rivers of Switzerland
Rivers of Valais
Tributaries of the Rhône